WIRJ (740 AM) is a radio station broadcasting a News Talk Information format. Licensed to Humboldt, Tennessee, United States, the station is currently owned by John F. Warmath.

References

External links

IRJ
News and talk radio stations in the United States
Gibson County, Tennessee